Davidow is a surname. Notable people with the surname include:

Jeffrey Davidow (born 1944), American diplomat
Joie Davidow, American author and editor
Ruth Davidow (1911–1999), American nurse and political activist

See also
 Davidoff (surname)
 Davidov (disambiguation)

Jewish surnames